Vugar Mehdiyev is a Paralympian athlete from Azerbaijan competing mainly in category T13 sprint events.

He competed in the 2008 Summer Paralympics in Beijing, China.  There he won a bronze medal in the men's 200 metres - T13 event and finished fourth in the men's 100 metres - T13 event

External links
 

Paralympic athletes of Azerbaijan
Athletes (track and field) at the 2008 Summer Paralympics
Paralympic bronze medalists for Azerbaijan
Azerbaijani male sprinters
Living people
Year of birth missing (living people)
Medalists at the 2008 Summer Paralympics
Paralympic medalists in athletics (track and field)
21st-century Azerbaijani people